Sonja Gerhardt (born 2 April 1989) is a German film and television actress. She is best known for her roles in the television series Schmetterlinge im Bauch and Deutschland 83, and the upcoming action-horror film Paranormal Activity: The Other Side.

Filmography 

 2006: Schmetterlinge im Bauch
 2008: 
 2008: In aller Freundschaft
 2008: Sklaven und Herren
 2009: Die Wilden Hühner und das Leben
 2009: 
 2009: WAGs
 2010: Im Spessart sind die Geister los
 2010: Der Doc und die Hexe
 2010: Stuttgart Homicide (Episode: Killesbergbaby)
 2010: 
 2010: Polizeiruf 110 (Episode: Risiko)
 2010: Das fremde Mädchen
 2010: Tatort (Episode: Borowski und eine Frage von reinem Geschmack)
 2010: Ein Date fürs Leben
 2010: Doctor’s Diary
 2011: Die Verführung – Das fremde Mädchen
 2011: Großstadtrevier (Episode: Vertauscht)
 2011: Küstenwache (Episode: Letzte Warnung)
 2011: Krauses Braut
 2011: Das Traumschiff (Episode: Kambodscha)
 2011:  2011: Rosa Roth (Episode: Bin ich tot?)
 2012:  2012:  2012: Mittlere Reife 2012: Heiraten ist auch keine Lösung 2012: Auf Herz und Nieren 2012: Danni Lowinski 2012: Schneeweißchen und Rosenrot 2013: Flaschenpost an meinen Mann 2013: Tape_13 2013: Heiter bis tödlich: Hauptstadtrevier 2014: #Vegas 2014: Die Schlikkerfrauen 2014: Weihnachten für Einsteiger 2014: Dessau Dancers 2015: Deutschland 83 (TV series)
 2016: Ku'damm 56 (TV series)
 2017: Honigfrauen (TV series)
 2018: Deutschland 86 2018: Kalte Füße 2018: Ku'damm 59 (TV series)
 2020: The Magic Kids – Three Unlikely heroes'' 2023: Paranormal Activity: The Other Side''

References

External links

German television actresses
1989 births
Living people
Actresses from Berlin
21st-century German actresses